Ruth Kilbourn was a Chicago-area dancer and dance teacher, born 1895. She was educated by prominent dance instructors in Chicago and appeared on Broadway and in the Chicago Opera House. A back injury forced her to end her performance career at a young age, but she cultivated a large following through her dance studio, the Kilbourn School of Dance. She tutored young dancers both in her home and in public schools throughout the city. Ruth Kilbourn's extensive work in the Chicago community also extended to animals, as she willed her home to the Chicago Anti-Cruelty Society upon her death.

External links
 Ruth Kilbourn Papers at Newberry Library

American female dancers
American dancers
Dance teachers
People from Chicago
1895 births
Year of death missing